Godvakker-Maren (Good Pretty Maren) is a Norwegian comedy film from 1940 directed by Knut Hergel, who also wrote the film script together with Alf Sommer and Einar Tveito. The script is based on Oskar Braaten's novel Bak høkerens disk and play Godvakker-Maren. The film premiered on October 31, 1940.

Plot
Two young girls from Hedmark get jobs at a grocery store run by Nils Andresen in Oslo. Andresen's wife is in bed with an illness, and Andresen is interested in his two young female employees. Maren, played by Eva Sletto, is also exposed to other vices in the capital before things settle down.

Cast 
 Eva Sletto as Maren
 Pehr Qværnstrøm as Nils Andresen, a grocer
 Dagmar Myhrvold as Matea, Andresen's wife
 Aasta Voss as Inga
 Bjarne Bø as the doctor
 Harald Heide-Steen as Even
 Alf Sommer as Tore
 Einar Tveito as the priest
 Øyvind Øyen as the constable
 Helge Essmar as Aksel

References

External links
 
 Godvakker-Maren at the National Library of Norway

1940 comedy films
Norwegian comedy films
Norwegian films based on plays
Norwegian black-and-white films
1940s Norwegian-language films